Beta-1,4 N-acetylgalactosaminyltransferase 2 is an enzyme that in humans is encoded by the B4GALNT2 gene.

References

External links

Further reading